The Northern Irish indie rock band Two Door Cinema Club have released five studio albums, four extended plays, 23 singles and 18 music videos.

Studio albums

Extended plays

Singles

Other charted songs

Music videos

Notes

References

External links
 
 
 
 

Alternative rock discographies
Discography
Discographies of British artists
Discographies of Irish artists